Sujitha (born 12 July 1982) is an Indian actress who works in Tamil, Telugu and Malayalam TV serials. She is known for portraying "Dhanam" in Pandian Stores and in Kerala, she is popular for portraying "Unnimaya" in the Asianet TV serial Harichandanam. She also acted in some Tamil, Telugu, Kannada and Malayalam films.

Personal life 
She was born to father T. S. Mani and mother Radha in Chennai, Tamil Nadu. Her family is from Trivandrum, Kerala. She has an elder brother, Surya Kiran and a younger sister, Sunitha.

She married ad film maker Dhanush and the couple settled in Chennai. The couple have a son Dhanwin.

Career 
She started her acting during her infancy. She first appeared in the film, Abbhas, as the granddaughter of K. R. Vijaya when she was just 41 days old.

Television 
TV serials 

 TV shows

Filmography

Actress

Dubbing artist

Awards

References

External links 
 
 

Living people
20th-century Indian actresses
21st-century Indian actresses
Indian film actresses
Actresses from Thiruvananthapuram
Indian child actresses
Actresses in Malayalam cinema
Actresses in Telugu cinema
Actresses in Tamil cinema
Indian soap opera actresses
1983 births
Actresses in Telugu television
Indian television actresses
Actresses in Tamil television
Child actresses in Malayalam cinema
Child actresses in Tamil cinema
Child actresses in Kannada cinema
Child actresses in Telugu cinema
Child actresses in Hindi cinema
Actresses in Malayalam television